Vredefort is a small farming town in the Free State province of South Africa with cattle, peanuts, sorghum, sunflowers and maize being farmed.  It is home to 3,000 residents.

The town was established in 1876 on a farm called Visgat, on the Vredefort impact structure, the largest and oldest visible bolide impact crater in the world (with a diameter of ). The town's name, which translates to "peace fort" in Afrikaans and Dutch, was derived from the peaceful conclusion to a threatened war between the Transvaal and the Orange Free State. The British built a concentration camp here during the Second Boer War to house Boer women and children.

The Vredefort Dome is currently the largest and one of the oldest known asteroid impact sites in the world. It is South Africa's seventh World Heritage Site and its status is largely due to the efforts of research scientists from Wits University.

Notable residents
 Alba Bouwer
 T.T. Cloete
 Hendrik van den Bergh

See also
Vredefort impact structure

References

External links

 Parys on the Vaal
 Vaal de Grace Estate

Populated places in the Ngwathe Local Municipality
Second Boer War concentration camps
Populated places established in 1878